V. indicus may refer to:
 Vanellus indicus, the red-wattled lapwing, a lapwing or large plover, a bird species
 Varanus indicus, the mangrove monitor, mangrove Gganna or Western Pacific monitor lizard, a lizard species
Virgibacillus indicus, a species of bacterium isolated from sediments from the Indian Ocean

See also
 Indicus (disambiguation)